Jarrod O'Doherty (born 16 September 1977) is a former professional rugby league footballer who played in the 1990s and 2000s. He played for the Newcastle Knights from 1997 to 1998 and 2001 to 2002 and finally the Huddersfield Giants in 2003.

References

External links
http://www.rugbyleagueproject.org/players/Jarrod_O-Doherty/summary.html

Australian rugby league players
Huddersfield Giants players
Newcastle Knights players
Living people
1977 births